The Allstar SZD-54 Perkoz is a Polish two-seat, glider, designed and produced by Allstar PZL Glider of Bielsko-Biała.

Design and development
The SZD-54  was designed in 1991, but company and political upheaval in Poland resulted in the glider not being put into production until 2011.

The aircraft is type certified to European Aviation Safety Agency CS22 standards. It features a cantilever mid-wing, a two-seats-in-tandem enclosed cockpit under a large bubble canopy and fixed monowheel gear with a small nosewheel and a tail caster.

The aircraft is made predominantly from fibreglass. All controls are automatically connected upon assembly. Despite its fixed landing gear, the SZD-54 has a best glide ratio of 42:1 with the  span wing.

The SZD-54 has a design airframe life of 15,000 flight hours, but is approved for 3,000 hours and comes from the factory with a two-year warranty.

Operational history
By November 2012 two examples had been registered in the United States with the Federal Aviation Administration.

In December 2017, the Colombian Air Force had received two SZD-54-2 gliders for training purposes.

Specifications (SZD-54-2, 20 m configuration)

See also

References

External links

1990s Polish sailplanes
Aircraft manufactured in Poland
Mid-wing aircraft
SZD aircraft
Aircraft first flown in 1991